Rõuge Valgjärv is a lake in Estonia's southeastern county of Võru, close to the border with Latvia.

See also
List of lakes of Estonia

Lakes of Estonia
Rõuge Parish
Lakes of Võru County